Ásíyih K͟hánum (‎ 18201886) was the wife of Baháʼu'lláh, the founder of the Baháʼí Faith. She is also known by her titles of Navváb, the Most Exalted Leaf, Búyúk K͟hánum or Hadrat-i-K͟hánum. K͟hánum is a title usually given to a Persian lady and is equivalent to madam. Baháʼu'lláh and Ásíyih Khánum were known as the Father of the Poor and the Mother of Consolation for their extraordinary generosity and regard for the impoverished. Baháʼu'lláh, along with Ásíyih Khánum and her children, are regarded as the Baháʼí holy family.

Background

Ásíyih Khánum was born Ásíyih Yalrúdí the only daughter of Mírzá Ismáʼíl Yalrúdí, an aristocrat and minister in the Qajar court in the village of Yal Rud in Mazandaran. She had one brother Mírzá Mahmúd who did not become a follower of Bábism nor of the Baháʼí Faith. The Yalrúdí family were high-ranking nobility, and Ásíyih was raised in extraordinary privilege. As a girl she was well-educated and was able to read and write in her native Persian as well Arabic.

Marriage

1832 her eldest brother, Mírzá Mahmúd, married an elder sister of Baháʼu'lláh; Sarah. Sarah was very close to Baháʼu'lláh and was gratified with evidence of young Ásíyih’s beauty, piety and kindness. She quickly devised a plan to marry the two together. Mírzá ʻAbbás Núrí accepted – perhaps enticed by the huge dowry which included three servants, large piece of land, property and a sum of money. The betrothal was then made official, but was delayed until Ásíyih came of age.

In October 1835, the fifteen-year-old Ásíyih Khánum married Baháʼu'lláh in a grand and sumptuous ceremony with the buttons on Ásíyih Khánum's clothes as jewels. These jewels were later sold to provide for food for the family during the persecution of Bábís in 1852. According to Baháʼí sources, Ásíyih and Baháʼu'lláh occupied themselves with philanthropy. She was known as the “Mother of Consolation” for her charity work among the destitute of Tehran.

The marriage resulted in seven children: Kázim, Sádiq, ʻAbbás,  ʻAlí-Muhammad, Bahíyyih, Mihdí, and ʻAlí-Muhammad.  Only three survived to adulthood all of whom were deeply loyal to their mother. Ásíyih Khánum was very close to her children, and took active participation in their upbringing especially that of ʻAbdu'l-Bahá. The Núrí family lived in the capital Tehran and Mazandaran in the summer months – the norm of upper-class Persian families.

As a Bábí

In 1844, Baháʼu'lláh heard of a new faith Bábism and accepted. Ásíyih soon joined to the new faith and became a fervent convert. She helped hide the Bábí leader Táhirih in her private parlour whilst she was hiding from government forces.

On 15 August 1852, a radical group of Bábís attempted the assassination of the Shah and failed. The group of Bábís linked with the plan were rounded up and killed, and, notwithstanding the assassins' claim that they were working alone, the entire Bábí community was blamed and a general pogrom of the Bábí community was started by the Shah. Bahá’u’lláh was arrested. Ásíyih’s home was looted, its possessions were taken away and she was left in practical poverty. She fled with her children and at times struggled to find enough money to feed them. They recall being given a handful of flour to satiate their hunger.

Baghdad

Bahá’u’lláh was eventually released, but banished from his homeland to Baghdad. Though both Bahá’u’lláh and Ásíyih were well-connected through their families, many distanced themselves from the couple during this time.  On leaving, no-one came to say goodbye save the "grandmother of Ásíyih Khánum". She reluctantly left her youngest child, Mihdí, in her care.

In the freezing winter of January 1853, the family began their journey to Baghdad. Ásíyih Khánum accompanied Baháʼu'lláh, who was weak and ill from his months in the dungeon, becoming his closest companion and confidante. She was also pregnant during the journey – causing her much difficulty.  

In 1854 Baháʼu'lláh decided to retreat to Kurdistan and left his two brothers Mírzá Músá and Subh-i-Azal to care for the family. According to her children’s recollections, Azal curtailed the family’s freedom. When Ásíyih's baby needed a doctor he forbade her from getting one. This child, born in Baghdad was named ʻAlí-Muhammad after the Báb. He died around 1855 at the age of two. Her daughter explains: "the sweet body of our beautiful baby was given to a man, who took it away, and we never knew even where he was laid. I remember so clearly the sorrow of those days". Bahá’u’lláh eventually returned, resulting in some stability for the family.

Constantinople and Adrianople

The family were subsequently exiled again to Constantinople in 1863. Shortly after the arrival in Constantinople they were exiled to the remote Adrianople. The journey was an exhausting and wearisome one during the winter. The cold took its toll on Ásíyih and she fell gravely ill. The five years in Adrianople were also unhappy. Bahá’u’lláh almost died in 1866  and she was threatened with being separated from her husband in 1868. It was, according to Baháʼís, through the intercession of ʻAbdu'l-Bahá that this was scrapped and the family all exiled together.

Acre

A royal command was issued in July 1868 condemning the Bábís/Baháʼís to perpetual imprisonment and isolation in far-flung outposts of the Ottoman Empire — Famagusta, Cyprus for Mirza Yahya and his followers, and ʻAkká, in Ottoman Palestine, for Baháʼu'lláh and his followers. Again and for the last time the family were exiled to the prison city of Acre, Israel. This was by far the hardest place the family had been to. Accompanying her was her twenty-four-year-old son,> her twenty-one-year-old daughter, her twenty-year-old son Mírzá Mihdí and her husband.

The Baháʼís arrived in August at the height of the summer. The inhabitants of Acre were told that the new prisoners were enemies of the state, of God and his religion, and that association with them was strictly forbidden. The aggressive public was jeering and throwing abuse. Almost all of the exiles fell dangerously ill.  The period was distressing for Ásíyih Khánum, as it was for many of the Baháʼís, due to the death of three Baháʼís and hostile behavior of the surrounding population. The Baháʼís were imprisoned under horrendous conditions in a cluster of cells covered in dirt and sewage and not given sufficient food for three days. The most trying circumstance for Ásíyih was probably the sudden and accidental death of her youngest son; twenty-two-year-old Mihdí. 

His death caused her much pain – so much so that her family feared for her sanity. According to Baháʼís, the disconsolate Ásíyih was comforted by Baháʼu'lláh who assured his wife their child was in heaven.

Easing of restrictions

In 1870, restrictions were eased for the family and they were moved from the prison. As the people of Acre started to respect the Baháʼís and in particular, ʻAbdu'l-Bahá, he was able to arrange for houses to be rented for the family, and the family finally moved to the Mansion of Bahjí around 1879 when an epidemic caused the inhabitants to flee.
Ásíyih was able to continue her nursing work she had started in Tehran. She was known in the city for helping the sick and developing remedies. Suffering from ill-health herself for most of her life, the climate of Acre exacerbated an already delicate constitution. 
As pilgrims began trickling in from Persia, Ásyih received them as “head of the household”. She was greatly respected and revered by Baháʼís and even by her own children.
Baháʼu'lláh called her “Navváb”. She was also affectionately known as Búyúk Khánum. He also named her Varaqiyih-'Ulyá (meaning "Most Exalted Leaf") and his "perpetual consort in the worlds of God". Baháʼu'lláh appointed her son ʻAbdu'l-Bahá as his successor.

Death

Ásíyih died in 1886, aged 66, from a fall with Baháʼu'lláh by her side. Her death was mourned by the populace of Acre; her funeral was attended by Muslims, Christians and Druze people. Baháʼu'lláh remarked that after Ásíyih, his light had been turned to darkness, his joy to sadness and calmness into agitation. Her death was followed by several other deaths which hurt the family: a year later the death of Mírzá Músá, the brother of Baháʼu'lláh, followed by that of ʻAbdu'l-Bahá's son and Baháʼu'lláh grandson (five-year-old Husayn) only increased Baháʼu'lláh's mourning.

Reburial

After Ásíyih died in 1886, she was buried in a Muslim cemetery in Acre. Western and Eastern pilgrims would travel to the cemetery to visit her grave and the grave of Mírzá Mihdí. In 1932 her daughter died and her wish was to be buried beside her mother and brother. Shoghi Effendi thought the gravesite of Ásíyih in this cemetery was unbefitting for her and her son.

After fifty-three years since her death, he arranged to secretly transfer her remains and that of her son to be buried near her daughter in Mount Carmel. They were removed from their previous resting places and the bodies were temporarily left in the Shrine of the Báb till the burial arrangements were finished.  He then cabled the Baháʼís:

He commissioned two marble monuments to be built made in Corinthian style from Italy.  After successfully transferring the remains, Shoghi Effendi reburied the two next to each other in a ceremony on Christmas Day of 1939.  The burial ground is now called the Monument Gardens, the burial ground of the Baháʼí "holy family", namely the wife, son, daughter and daughter-in-law of Baháʼu'lláh.

Appearance and personality
Tall (relative to nineteenth century Persian standards) with a fair complexion, dark hair, deep blue eyes and regular features, Ásíyih was a noted beauty.  Her daughter described her as a "pearl…amongst women." Historical accounts write that she was "slender, stately…with white skin and blue eyes and dark hair" and "winsome, vivacious and exceedingly beautiful". All her children inherited her physical features.

Ásíyih was aristocratic in her bearing, and at times struggled with life as an exile. Unaccustomed to labour, during the exile of Baghdad Ásíyih’s hands cut and bled from blisters caused by washing clothes. She was also remembered as having a strong character. Her son `Abdu’l-Bahá reflected “she was patient, God-fearing, calm, humble and contented.” Shoghi Effendi has described her as having "continued to evince a fortitude, a piety, a devotion and a nobility of soul".

Ásíyih was extremely religious. After the unexpected death of her son Mírzá Mihdí, Ásíyih consoled herself with her strongly held belief that he was in heaven. Her granddaughter recalled “my eyes will always see her in her blue dress…her sweet, smiling face…as she chanted prayers in her musical voice.”

Even as a young woman in Tehran, Ásíyih was known for her work with the poor. This carried on during her imprisonment in Acre. During the period when the exiled Bahá’í community had been granted relative freedom, Ásíyih helped nurse the sick of Acre.

See also
Baháʼu'lláh's family
Others buried in the Monument Gardens:
Mirzá Mihdí, Baháʼu'lláh's youngest son by Ásíyih to survive infancy.
Bahíyyih Khánum, Baháʼu'lláh's daughter by Ásíyih.
Munirih Khánum, daughter-in-law by Ásíyih and wife of ʻAbdu'l-Bahá, Ásíyih's eldest son.
Baháʼí Holy Family: 
ʻAbdu'l-Bahá, eldest son of Ásíyih and Baháʼu'lláh.
Shoghi Effendi, grandson of ʻAbdu'l-Bahá, great-grandson of Ásíyih and Baháʼu'lláh, and the Guardian, or head, of the Baháʼí Faith.
Rúhíyyih Khánum, wife of Shoghi Effendi.
Khadíjih-Bagum, wife of The Báb.

Notes

Citations

References

Family of Baháʼu'lláh
1820 births
1886 deaths
People from Tehran
Iranian emigrants to the Ottoman Empire
Burials at Monument Gardens, Haifa
People from Acre, Israel
Iranian prisoners and detainees
Female religious leaders
19th-century Iranian people
Women mystics